"Searching for Heaven" is the third and final single from Pauline Murray and The Invisible Girls, released in April 1981 on Illusive Records. It was produced by Martin Hannett.

The title track featured both band-member Wayne Hussey and guest musician Bernard Sumner on guitars, as Vini Reilly, who had played on the album, had left to form The Durutti Column.

Track list

7" version

A-side
"Searching for Heaven"

B-side
"Animal Crazy"

10" version

A-side
"Searching for Heaven"

B-side
"Animal Crazy"
"The Visitor"

Credits
Pauline Murray: vocals
Robert Blamire: bass
Steve Hopkins: keyboards
Wayne Hussey: guitar
John Maher: drums
Bernard Sumner: guitar ("Searching for Heaven") (uncredited)
Martin Hannett: producer
Martin Atkins: sleeve designer

References

External links 
Discogs.com - Searching For Heaven (7" single)
Discogs.com - Searching For Heaven (10" single)
Martin Hannett and Tony Wilson in Strawberry Studios, July 1980 Martin Hannett explaining his production of Pauline Murray and the Invisible Girls' "The Visitor" song.

1981 singles
1981 songs
Song recordings produced by Martin Hannett